The Blue Amazon (Portuguese: A Amazônia Azul) or Brazilian maritime territory (Portuguese: território marítimo brasileiro) is the exclusive economic zone (EEZ) of Brazil. It is an offshore area of 3.6 million square km on the Brazilian coast, rich in marine biodiversity and energy resources. The size is equivalent to the surface of the Amazon rainforest. The name is a reference to the biologically rich region of the Brazilian Amazon, with the addition of the adjective blue denoting the ocean.

The area may be expanded to 4.4 million square kilometres in view of the Brazilian claim that was submitted to the United Nations Commission on the Limits of the Continental Shelf (CLCS) in 2004. It is proposed to extend Brazil's continental shelf to 900 thousand square kilometers of marine soil and subsoil, which the country will be able to explore. With the extension, the area will become more contiguous, including the areas of Brazilian archipelagos in the South Atlantic . The region with the largest Blue Amazon is the Northeast, due to the existence of several islands that are well spaced from each other in a contiguous marine zone (the island of Trindade is too far from the coast for the same to occur).

Economic potential

This region has many riches and potential for various types of economic use:

 Fishing, due to the enormous diversity of marine species that reside in this region.
 Metallic minerals and other mineral resources in the seabed;
 Enormous biodiversity of marine species that reside in this region.
 Oil, as found in the Campos Basin and in the Pre-salt layer (Campos Basin, Santos Basin and Espírito Santo Basin – prospecting in these areas already accounts for two million barrels of oil per day, 90% of the current Brazilian production );
 Use of tidal energy and wind energy on the high seas or offshore.

History 
With the entry into force of the United Nations Convention on the Law of the Sea (UNCR) in 1995, and in accordance with its provisions, by which rocks without permanent human occupation do not give the right to the establishment of an Exclusive Economic Zone , aiming to explore, to conserve and manage the resources of the region, Brazil – which already occupied the archipelago of Trindade and Martin Vaz, now also occupies the Saint Peter and Saint Paul Archipelago. This decision elevated them to the status of an archipelago, allowing the country to expand its EEZ by 450 thousand square kilometers, an area equivalent to the Brazilian state of Bahia.

Geography

References

External links 
 Gonçalves, JB – Brazilian Rights in an Exclusive Economic Zone ...
 Islands of Brazil: Brazil beyond 200 miles. O Globo , October 12, 2008, p. 59.

Brazil
Marine ecoregions
Biota of the Atlantic Ocean
Ecoregions of Brazil
Environment of Brazil
Borders of Brazil
Economy of Brazil